Grahamomyia is a genus of crane fly in the family Limoniidae. There is only one known species.

Distribution
Sichuan, China.

Species
G. bicellula Alexander, 1935

References

Limoniidae
Nematocera genera
Diptera of Asia